Events from the year 1626 in Sweden

Incumbents
 Monarch – Gustaf II Adolf

Events

 7 January – Swedish victory in the Battle of Wallhof
 September-October – Swedish victory in the Battle of Gniew
 
 The visions of Margareta i Kumla attracts pilgrimages from all the nation.

Births

 17 May – Countess Palatine Eleonora Catherine of Zweibrücken, princess  (died 1692) 
 17 June – Johan Baazius the younger, archbishop  (died 1681) 
 19 April – Christina, Queen of Sweden, monarch  (died 1689) 
 Brita Rosladin  (died 1675)

Deaths

References

 
Years of the 17th century in Sweden
Sweden